William Steffe (c.1830 – c.1890), born in South Carolina, United States, was a Philadelphia bookkeeper and insurance agent.  He is credited with collecting and editing the musical tune for a camp-meeting song with the traditional "Glory Hallelujah" refrain, in about 1856.  It opened with  "Say, brothers, will you meet us / on Canaan's happy shore?"  The tune became widely known.

Early in the American Civil War, this tune was used to create the Union army marching song "John Brown's Body", which begins with the lyrics "John Brown's body lies a-mouldering in the grave, but his soul goes marching on."

In November 1861, Julia Ward Howe, having heard this version, used the tune as the basis of her new verse, later known as "The Battle Hymn of the Republic".

References

C. A. Brown (revised by Willard A. Heaps), The Story of Our National Ballads, 1960, pages 174–178
William A. Ward (ed.), The American Bicentennial Songbook, Vol. 1 (1770–1870s), 1975, page 236

External links
Battle hymn of the Republic (Julia Ward Howe/William Steffe) (1861)
Civil war music
The Battle Hymn Of The Republic (aka John Brown's Body)
Music of the Civil war
William Steffe and The Battle Hymn of the Republic

 
 

1830 births
1890 deaths
19th-century American composers
19th-century American male musicians
American male composers
Bookkeepers
Insurance agents
Musicians from South Carolina